Brookside Cemetery is an historic 3.41-acre cemetery in Dayton, Oregon, United States. Joel Palmer set aside land for the cemetery in the 1850s; he deeded the site to the Dayton School District in 1874. 479 people are known to have been buried there between July 1864 and June 1987; there are presently no vacant plots. The cemetery is listed on the National Register of Historic Places.

See also

 National Register of Historic Places listings in Yamhill County, Oregon

References

External links
 
 

1850s establishments in Oregon
Cemeteries on the National Register of Historic Places in Oregon
Dayton, Oregon
National Register of Historic Places in Yamhill County, Oregon